Zwickau is a district (Kreis) in the Free State of Saxony, Germany.

History 
The district was established by merging the former districts Zwickauer Land, Chemnitzer Land and the urban district Zwickau as part of the district reform of August 2008.

Geography 
The district is located in the northern foothills of the Erzgebirge, west of Chemnitz. The main rivers of the district are the Zwickauer Mulde and the Pleiße. It borders (from the west and clockwise) the state Thuringia, the district Mittelsachsen, the urban district Chemnitz, and the districts Erzgebirgskreis and Vogtlandkreis.

Towns and municipalities

Towns

Crimmitschau
Glauchau
Hartenstein
Hohenstein-Ernstthal
Kirchberg
Lichtenstein
Limbach-Oberfrohna
Meerane
Oberlungwitz
Waldenburg
Werdau
Wildenfels
Wilkau-Haßlau
Zwickau

Municipalities

Bernsdorf
Callenberg
Crinitzberg
Dennheritz
Fraureuth
Gersdorf
Hartmannsdorf bei Kirchberg
Hirschfeld
Langenbernsdorf
Langenweißbach
Lichtentanne
Mülsen
Neukirchen
Niederfrohna
Oberwiera
Reinsdorf
Remse
Sankt Egidien
Schönberg

Notes

References

External links

Official website